Yevgeny Kafelnikov defeated Alexander Volkov 6–4, 6–3 to secure the title.

Seeds

  Thomas Muster (second round)
  Marc Rosset (first round)
  Karel Nováček (second round)
  Alexander Volkov (final)
  Amos Mansdorf (first round)
  Andrei Chesnokov (first round)
  Richard Fromberg (second round)
  Brett Steven (second round)

Draw

Finals

Section 1

Section 2

External links
1994 Adelaide International Draw

Singles
Next Generation Adelaide International
1994 in Australian tennis